Stephen Clifton (born 27 May 1987) is a former professional Australian rules footballer who played for the Greater Western Sydney Giants in the Australian Football League (AFL).

Clifton, who played his junior football with Lake Wendouree before graduating to the North Ballarat Rebels and then the North Ballarat Football Club in the Victorian Football League (VFL). In 2010 he tied with Shane Valenti of Port Melbourne to win the J. J. Liston Trophy.

Clifton made his debut in round 16, 2012, against  at Sydney Showground Stadium. After five games he was delisted at the end of the season.

He returned to North Ballarat and in 2013 he won his second J. J. Liston Trophy, this time in a three-way tie with Mitch Hallahan of Box Hill and Jordan Schroder of Geelong.

References

External links

1987 births
Living people
Greater Western Sydney Giants players
Australian rules footballers from Victoria (Australia)
J. J. Liston Trophy winners
North Ballarat Football Club players